Liban Abdi Egal is a Somali entrepreneur. He is the founder and chairman of First Somali Bank (FSB), established in 2012.

References

Living people
Ethnic Somali people
Somalian businesspeople
Somalian Muslims
Year of birth missing (living people)